

Arthropods

Insects

Vertebrates

Newly named non-mammalian synapsids

Data courtesy of George Olshevsky's dinosaur genera list.

Newly named avialaens

Newly named dinosaurs

Literature
 Hunting Dinosaurs in the Badlands of the Red Deer River Valley, Alberta by C. H. Sternberg was published. Although the work was mostly non-fiction, it concluded with a series of fictional chapters wherein Sternberg dreamt of traveling back in time to the various ages of prehistory.

References

1910s in paleontology
Paleontology
Paleontology 7